The 2007 Ford Ironman World Championship was a triathlon race held on October 13, 2007 in Kailua, Hawaii County, Hawaii. It was the 31st Ironman World Championship, which has been held annually in Hawaii since 1978. The champions were Chris McCormack and Chrissie Wellington. The championship was organised by the World Triathlon Corporation (WTC).

Medallists

Men

Women

References

Ironman World Championship
Ironman
Sports competitions in Hawaii
2007 in sports in Hawaii
Triathlon competitions in the United States